Caldera Airport ,  is a desert airport serving Caldera, a Pacific coastal port in the Atacama Region of Chile.

The Caldera non-directional beacon (Ident: CLD) is located on the field.

See also

Transport in Chile
List of airports in Chile

References

External links
OpenStreetMap - Caldera
OurAirports - Caldera
SkyVector - Caldera
FallingRain - Caldera Airport

Airports in Atacama Region